Eliane Elias Plays Live is the twentieth studio album by Brazilian jazz pianist Eliane Elias. It was recorded live in Amsterdam on May 31, 2002, and released only on November 9, 2010, by Somethin' Else Records / EMI labels under exclusive licence to Blue Note.

Track listing

Credits
Marc Johnson – bass
Eliane Elias – concert grand piano
Joey Baron – drums

References

External links

2010 albums
Eliane Elias albums
Blue Note Records albums
EMI Records albums